is a Japanese photographer and contemporary artist working in the genres self-portraiture, portraiture, street photography, installation, research-based and still life.

In 2000, Nagashima was awarded the prestigious Kimura Ihei Award. Nagashima is a photography lecturer at Waseda, Tokyo and Musashino Universities in Tokyo and a visiting professor at Kyoto Art University.

Early work
Yurie Nagashima rose to national fame in Japan after receiving the second annual Urbanart award hosted by the Parco Gallery in Tokyo in 1993 for a series of photographs depicting herself and her family in the nude. Nagashima was nominated for the award by Nobuyoshi Araki, one of Japan's best known photographers. At the time, Nagashima was still a student at Musashino Art University in Tokyo from where she graduated in 1995 with a BA in visual communication design. In 1995, Nagashima had a two-person exhibition with the American photographer Catherine Opie at the Parco Gallery, Tokyo. Following this encounter with Opie, Nagashima embarked on a MFA at the California Institute of the Arts under her supervision.

In at times provocative photographs, Nagashima has tested public perceptions on obscenity and censorship in Japan.

Photography Monographs 
Nagashima has published numerous important photography monographs that deal with the family, gender, identity and sexuality, such as Senaka no kioku (2009) (literally translated, "Memories of a back" which hints at childhood where children are carried on their mother's backs). The series depicts biographical stories from her childhood.

Photobooks are an important format in the history of Japanese photography. This format became more important than prints starting in the 1960s due to the quality of design, printing and materials.

Nagashima's photobooks include:
Nagashima Yurie Photobook, Fuga, Tokyo, 1995. .
Empty White Room, Little More, Tokyo, 1995. .
Kazoku / A Family, Korinsha Press, Kyoto, 1998. .
Pastime Paradise, Madra, Tokyo, 2000. .
not six, Switch, Tokyo, 2004. .
Senaka no Kioku, Kodansha, Tokyo, 2009. . 
Swiss, Akaaka, Tokyo, 2010. .
5 comes after 6, MATCH and Company, Tokyo, 2014.

Exhibitions 
From 2000 to 2014, Nagashima was represented by the gallery SCAI the Bathhouse in Tokyo, where she had numerous solo and group exhibitions.

In addition to her work as a photographer and photography lecturer, in August 2014, Nagashima was a Master at the International Summer School of Photography, in Latvia. She led a workshop titled 'Photography as a Subversive Tactic: Being the Other'.

Nagashima is currently represented by MAHO KUBOTA GALLERY.

Scholarly works 
Nagashima wrote a book titled 「僕らの女の子写真からわたしたちのガーリーフォトへ」which was published by Daifukushorin in 2020. The work is based on her master's dissertation from Musashino University. She used discourse analysis to closely study the art criticism surrounding the 1990s photography movement that she was part of, to prove how a gender-biassed narrative dismissed the importance of her and others in the movement.

Curation 
Nagashima curated a major show at the 21st Century Museum of Contemporary Art, Kanazawa called "Countermeasures Against Awkward Discourses: From the Perspective of Third Wave Feminism" from October 15, 2021—March 13, 2022.

Solo exhibitions

2022	“Where the gaze resides” DOMANI plus @ Aichi 
2020	 "B&W" Maho Kubota Gallery
2016	"about home" Maho Kubota Gallery
2015	 "5 Comes After 6" UTRECHT, Tokyo
2011	 "What I was supposed to see and what Isaw" 1223 GENDAIKAIGA, Tokyo
2010	 "SWISS" SCAI THE BATHHOUSE, viewing space, Tokyo
2007	 "a box named flower" lammfromm, Tokyo
2005	 "Her Projects – memories of no one" KIRIN PLAZA OSAKA, Osaka
2004	 "Candy Horror" SCAI THE BATHHOUSE, Tokyo
2004	 "not six" NADiff, Tokyo
2000	 "PASTIME PARADISE" SCAI THE BATHHOUSE, Tokyo
1999	 "I want to be your power" California Institute of the Arts, California
1994	 "Nagashima Yurie - A Room of Love-" P-House Gallery, Tokyo

Awards

 Kodansha Essay Award, Tokyo (2010)
The 26th Kimura Ihei Photography Award, Tokyo (2001)
 PARCO Prize in URBANART #2, Tokyo (1993)

References 

1973 births
Living people
Japanese photographers
Japanese women photographers
Portrait photographers
California Institute of the Arts alumni